The 1982 Iowa State Senate elections took place as part of the biennial 1982 United States elections. Iowa voters elected state senators in 29 of the state senate's 50 districts—all 25 of the odd-numbered seats were up for regularly-scheduled elections to four-year terms and, due to the oddities of redistricting following the 1980 Census, four of the even-numbered seats were up as well. State senators serve four-year terms in the Iowa State Senate, with half of the seats traditionally up for election each cycle.

The Iowa General Assembly provides statewide maps of each district. To compare the effect of the 1981 redistricting process on the location of each district, contrast the previous map with the map used for 1982 elections.

The primary election on June 8, 1982 determined which candidates appeared on the November 2, 1982 general election ballot. Primary election results can be obtained here. General election results can be obtained here.

Following the previous election in 1980, Republicans had control of the Iowa state Senate with 29 seats to Democrats' 21 seats.

To take control of the chamber from Republicans, the Democrats needed to net 5 Senate seats.

Democrats flipped control of the Iowa State Senate following the 1982 general election, with Democrats holding 28 seats and Republicans having 22 seats after the election (a net gain of 7 seats for the Democrats).

In 1982, after winning his election in the forty-third senatorial district, Thomas Mann became the first Black person elected to the Iowa Senate.

Summary of Results
NOTE: 21 of the 25 even-numbered districts did not have elections in 1982 so they are not listed here.
Also note, an asterisk (*) after a Senator's name indicates they were an incumbent re-elected, but to a new district number due to redistricting. 

Source:

Detailed Results
Reminder: All odd-numbered Iowa Senate seats were up for election to full four-year terms in 1982, as well as four even-numbered seats that had elections for two-year terms due to the oddities caused by redistricting. All other even-numbered districts did not have elections in 1982 & are not shown.

Note: If a district does not list a primary, then that district did not have a competitive primary (i.e., there may have only been one candidate file for that district).

District 1

District 2

District 3

District 5

District 6

District 7

District 9

District 11

District 13

District 15

District 16

District 17

District 19

District 21

District 23

District 24

District 25

District 27

District 29

District 31

District 33

District 35

District 37

District 39

District 41

District 43

District 45

District 47

District 49

See also
 United States elections, 1982
 United States House of Representatives elections in Iowa, 1982
 Elections in Iowa

References

1982 Iowa elections
Iowa Senate elections
Iowa State Senate